Sarah Evershed Brackett (13 May 1938 – 3 July 1996) was an American-born television and film actress who worked mostly in Britain.

Brackett's parents were William Oliver Brackett, a Presbyterian minister, and his wife Nancy Alexis Thompson, who had been born in Scotland. They were married in Edinburgh in 1931, and Brackett was born in Lake Forest, Illinois. In 1945, her father died, and her mother decided to return home, so that from the age of seven Brackett was brought up in Scotland. She trained for an acting career at the Edinburgh College of Speech and Drama. Her entry in Spotlight in 1966 reported that she spoke fluent French and German.

Brackett began her career in the theatre. In 1960 she was in repertory at the Byre Theatre in St Andrews, and in 1961 played Portia in a production of The Merchant of Venice at the Colchester Repertory Theatre. She also appeared in West End musicals, including A Funny Thing Happened on the Way to the Forum at the Strand Theatre, and in a production of Funny Girl at the Prince of Wales in 1966 she played Vera, a showgirl.

She last worked as an actress in the late 1980s. On 3 July 1996, she was found dead, aged 58, in her flat in Westminster, London. The cause of death was found to be suicide and the date was estimated as 17 June.

Filmography
Hugh and I, episode "April in Paris" (1963): Check-in Clerk
The Third Secret (1964): Nurse
The Saint, episode "The Unkind Philanthropist" (1964): Tristan Brown
The Masque of the Red Death (1964): Grandmother
Danger Man (1965): Annette / Glover's secretary
BBC Play of the Month Lee Oswald: Assassin (1966): Katherine Mallory
Funeral in Berlin (1966): Babcock
George and the Dragon, episode "The French Lesson" (1967): Air Hostess
Battle Beneath the Earth (1967): Meg Webson
Detective, episode "Deaths on the Champs-Élysées" (1968): Valerie Dupont
The Portrait of a Lady (television series, 1968): Henrietta Stackpole
The Way We Live Now (television series, 1969): Mrs Hurtle
Counterstrike (1969 BBC television series): Mary
 The Golden Bowl (1972, TV series): Mrs. Rance
Sex Play (1974): Harriet Best
Katy (television series, 1976): Mrs Florence
The Awakening of Emily (1976): Margaret Foster
Oppenheimer (1980 miniseries): Priscilla Duffield
Priest of Love (1981): Achsah Barlow Brewster
The Lords of Discipline (1983): Mrs Durrell
The Old Men at the Zoo (1983): Reporter at White House 
Scream for Help (1984): School Secretary
What Mad Pursuit? (1985): Lady at Literary Luncheon
Odyssée d'amour (1987)

References

External links
 

1938 births
1996 deaths
American film actresses
American people of Scottish descent
20th-century American actresses
American emigrants to Scotland
Scottish actresses
1996 suicides
Suicides in Westminster